The Kasai region is a region in the central southern part of the Democratic Republic of the Congo. It shares its name with the Kasai River.

After the independence of Congo in 1960, Kasai seceded for a while under influence of Belgium and became an independent kingdom. After the assassination of Patrice Lumumba the following year, Kasai came back to Congo.

Until 2015 Kasai region was divided administratively into two provinces, Kasai-Occidental and Kasai-Oriental. After 2015, the former Districts within these provinces were in some cases combined with cities that had been independently administered, and their status was elevated to the five current provinces:
 Kasaï Province
 Kasaï-Central
 Sankuru
 Kasaï-Oriental
 Lomami Province

2017 rebellion

In spring 2017, long-running resentment of central government's remoteness and corruption exploded into a rebellion, triggered by official rejection of a local chief, Kamwina Nsapu, who in August was killed by security forces. In the fighting that followed, nearly 1.4 million people were displaced, among them around 850,000 children, leading to a hunger crisis across the region as subsistence farmers were unable to plant crops.

See also
 History of the Kasai region

References

Geography of the Democratic Republic of the Congo
Regions of Africa